Amiesh Maheshbhai Saheba (born 15 November 1959 in Ahmedabad) is an Indian cricket umpire and former cricketer. He played as a batsman for Gujarat.

Saheba played 15 times for Gujarat in First-class cricket between 1983 and 1989.

He stood in his first Test match as an umpire on 12 December 2008. He has officiated in 51 One Day Internationals, four Twenty20 Internationals and three Test Matches.

Saheba retired as a national-level umpire in 2019 having officiated in 113 matches, at the time a record for an Indian umpire.

See also
 List of Test cricket umpires
 List of One Day International cricket umpires
 List of Twenty20 International cricket umpires

References

External links
 Cricinfo profile

1959 births
Living people
Indian cricketers
Gujarat cricketers
Indian Test cricket umpires
Indian One Day International cricket umpires
Indian Twenty20 International cricket umpires
Cricketers from Ahmedabad
Gujarati people